Edie is a 2017 British drama film directed by Simon Hunter and written by Elizabeth O'Halloran. The film stars Sheila Hancock, Kevin Guthrie and Paul Brannigan. The soundtrack was written by Debbie Wiseman. Principal photography began in the Scottish Highlands in 2016.

Plot 
Edith Moore (Edie) is a bitter, gruff woman in her eighties. In the months following her husband George's death, Edie's strained
relationship with her daughter Nancy begins to worsen. The question over Edie's future looms large; while Edie tries hard to
convince Nancy she can manage fine by herself, Nancy is making plans for her mother to move to a retirement home.
Edie feels like it is the beginning of the end. It seems she will die with all the regrets of her past intact and one regret haunts
her most of all. When Edie was married, her father planned a hiking trip for them to climb Suilven in the Scottish Highlands. Edie yearned to
go, but her husband George, an abusive and controlling man, made her stay at home. Nearly thirty years later, Edie decides
to make the trip herself alone.

Cast 
 Sheila Hancock as Edie
 Kevin Guthrie as Jonny
 Paul Brannigan as McLaughlin
 Amy Manson as Fiona
 Wendy Morgan as Nancy

Production 
Principal photography on the film began in May 2016. The primary filming location was the village of Lochinver and the mountain Suilven in the Northern Scottish Highlands. Sheila Hancock completed the trek up the mountain herself, and claims to have been the oldest person to do so. The film was completed in March 2017.

Reception 
The film received a good audience reception on release. On review aggregator Rotten Tomatoes, the film holds an approval rating of 62% based on 42 reviews, with an average rating of 6.07/10.

References

External links 
 Edie Official Webpage
 Debbie Wisman - BBC Edie Original Soundtrack
 
 

2017 independent films
2017 films
British drama films
British independent films
Films about old age
Films about widowhood
Films set in Scotland
Films shot in Scotland
Mountaineering films
2010s English-language films
2010s British films